Born Naked is an album by RuPaul 2014

Born Naked may also refer to
"Born Naked", spoken word track by actor Tim Robbins on Woodie Guthrie album 'Til We Outnumber 'Em... The Songs of Woodie Guthrie 2000
"Born Naked", song by RuPaul from Born Naked 2014
"Born Naked", single by Triston Palma 1995
"Born Naked", book by Farley Mowat 1993